The 2014 Saudi Crown Prince Cup Final was the 39th final of the Crown Prince Cup. It took place on 1 February 2014 at the King Fahd International Stadium in Riyadh, Saudi Arabia and was contested between Al-Nassr and Al-Hilal. It was Al-Nassr's sixth Crown Prince Cup final and Al-Hilal's 14th final. This was the second meeting between these two clubs in the final and was a repeat of last year's final.

Al-Nassr won the match 2–1 and secured their third title and first since 1974. In addition, this was the first time since 2007 that a team other than Al-Hilal won the title.

Teams

Venue

The King Fahd International Stadium was announced as the host of the final venue. This was the 13th Crown Prince Cup final hosted in the King Fahd International Stadium following those in 1992, 1994, 1998, 2003, 2004, 2005, 2006, 2008, 2009, 2010, 2012 and 2013.

The King Fahd International Stadium was built in 1982 and was opened in 1987. The stadium was used as a venue for the 1992, 1995, and the 1997 editions of the FIFA Confederations Cup. Its current capacity is 68,752 and it is used by the Saudi Arabia national football team, Al-Nassr, Al-Shabab, and major domestic matches.

Background
Al-Hilal reached a record 14th final after a 2–0 away win to Al-Fateh. This was Al-Hilal's seventh final in a row. Previously, they won finals in 1964, 1995, 2000, 2003, 2005, 2006, 2008, 2009, 2010, 2011, 2012, and 2013, and lost in 1999. Al-Hilal entered the match as six-time defending champions.

Al-Nassr reached their sixth final, after a 1–0 win against city rivals Al-Shabab. They reached their second consecutive final having lost last year's final against Al-Hilal.

This was the second meeting between these two sides in the Crown Prince Cup final after last year's final. Al-Hilal won last year's final 4–2 on a penalty shoot-out after a 1–1 draw at the end of extra time. This was the tenth meeting between these two sides in the Crown Prince Cup; Al-Hilal won 7 times, Al-Nassr won once and the two teams drew once in last year's final. The two teams played each other once in the season prior to the final. Al-Nassr won the match 2–1 thanks to a brace from Mohammed Al Sahlawi.

Road to the final 

Key: (H) = Home; (A) = Away

Match

Details

{| width="100%"
|valign="top" width="40%"|

See also

 2013–14 Saudi Crown Prince Cup
 2013–14 Saudi Professional League
 2014 King Cup of Champions

References

External links

Sports competitions in Saudi Arabia
February 2014 sports events in Asia
Al Nassr FC matches
Al Hilal SFC matches